Conan the Magnificent is a fantasy novel by American writer Robert Jordan, featuring Robert E. Howard's sword and sorcery hero Conan the Barbarian. It was first published in paperback by Tor Books in May 1984, and was reprinted in December 1991; a trade paperback edition followed from the same publisher in 1991. The first British edition was published in paperback by Sphere Books in July 1986 and reprinted in September 1989; a later British edition was published in paperback by Legend Books in February 1997. The novel was later gathered together with Conan the Triumphant and Conan the Destroyer into the hardcover omnibus collection The Conan Chronicles II (Legend, April 1997), and was later gathered together with Conan the Triumphant and Conan the Victorious into the hardcover omnibus collection The Further Chronicles of Conan (Tor Books, October 1999).

Plot
During a prologue, set in the Kezankian Mountains, an evil priest named Basraken Ismalla sacrifices an entire tribe of hillmen to appease his dragon god. Ismalla is searching for three magical rubies known as the Eyes of Fire. These gems will allow him to direct the creature against his enemies.

The scene shifts to Shadizar, Zamora's infamous City of the Wicked, where a newly-arrived Conan attempts to steal an emerald goblet as pension in repaying a gambling debt. However, his plans are foiled by the interference of Tamira, a female thief. Meanwhile, a noblewoman named Lady Jondra scouts out Conan as a possible paramour, even as Tamira inveigles her way into Jondra's household with the intent of stealing a stash of exotic jewels. Looking to settle scores with the thief, Conon follows Jondra's hunting party out of the city.

Eventually, Conan encounters Jondra, separated from her party and besieged by wolves. He drives off the creatures and gains her favor. He learns that Jondra is hunting the Dragon. After besting the lady's huntsman during a spear-throwing contest, Conan is offered a higher estimation by Jondra and given a place at her bedside.

Jondra's expedition encounters Eldran, sole survivor of a Brythunian village destroyed by the Dragon, who, armed with a magic sword, is also after the beast. Jondra dismisses his warnings of its ferocity and sends Eldran off. That night, a band of Kezankian raiders attack the camp. Fortunately, Conan rallies the hunters and prevents a massacre from happening. In the wake of the carnage, General Zanthinides of the Zamoran army arrives, pressing Lady Jondra to return to Shadizar under his escort. She refuses the general's offer. Afterwards, Zanthindies tries in vain to rape her, but is thwarted by Conan.

Meanwhile, Ismalla is becoming frustrated. Both his hired thieves and warriors have been unsuccessful with their operations. Now, all of his strategies on obtaining the Eyes of Fire have miscarried, while his leadership over the Kezankian tribes, who revere the Dragon, is in jeopardy. However, Ismalla manages to protect his position by killing a rival chief and finds personal oversight in his effort to gain possession of the rubies.

Lady Jondra's hunting party finally encounters its prey, and is decimated by the Dragon. The survivors scatter. Conan brings those he can find back together. Tamira and the lady are with him that night when the Kezankians attack the camp, slaughtering the hunters. In the battle, Conan and Tamira are separated from Jondra.

Conan leaves Tamira hidden to go and find Jondra. While he is gone, Tamira is captured by the hillmen. Returning to camp, Conan finds little spared by the hillsmen. He gathers what he can comes and across the chief huntsmen, his mind shattered by the battle, and the encounter with the beast.

It is the lone wanderer Eldran who stumbles across her. As petulant as ever, she knocks him unconscious with a well aimed stone when he professes his love for her. She flees only to be captured a short while later by hillmen.

Having lost Jondra, Conan returns to find Tamira missing. He follows the hillsmen's trail and instead stumbles across Eldran and his group. He learns of Jondra's peril. They join forces, and together with Eldran's countrymen continue to seek the lady and Tamira.

Jondra and Tamira are now in the hands of Basraken Ismalla. Basraken learns that the Eyes of Fire he sought were with a woman matching Jondra's description he orders his men to search through all the recovered items from the hunter's camp.

Conan and the Brythunian party reach Basraken's encampment, but, seeing the army he has amassed, sends a runner to find the Zamoran cavalry and hopefully lead then to assist in their planned attack.

Now, having the Eyes of Fire in his possession, Basrakes intends to summon the creature and sacrifice the women.

Seeing the women unharmed, Conan, Eldran and one of his men decide that they cannot wait for the army and make an attempt to sneak down into the camp. An alarm rises during the ritual and Conan thinks he is discovered only to hear the cry of the hillsmen. The army has arrived.

As the army attacks and Conan frees the women, the beast heeding its call, arrives into the melee.

Reception
Don D'Ammassa called the novel "[a] nicely told adventure."

The novel was also reviewed by Andy Sawyer in Paperback Inferno #62.

References

External links
Page at Fantastic Fiction

1984 American novels
1984 fantasy novels
Conan the Barbarian novels
American fantasy novels
Tor Books books